Hari Singh Rawat (born 26 May 1955) is an Indian Politician and Business Man, former Member of Legislative Assembly of the 14th Vidhan Sabha from Bhim constituency, Rajasthan. He is a member of Bharatiya Janta Party (BJP), and has been elected consecutively 2003, 2008 and 2013 for three time as a Member of Legislative Assembly (MLA) from Bhim constituency, Rajasthan. He has also served in Indian Army from the year 1976 to 1981.  He is the Former Chairman (State Minister) of State Magra Vikas board, Rajasthan Government.

Early life
Hari Singh Rawat was born on 26 May 1955 at Bhim, Rajsamand in Rajasthan. He did his schooling at Govt. Secondary School, Bhim.

Personal life
Hari Singh Rawat married Smt. Vimla Rawat on 8 May 1971 and has 4 children 2 daughters and 2 sons.  He is a traveling and adventure sports enthusiast. He has traveled to various countries for business purpose and has been the best athlete in Udaipur division from the year 1971 to 1973. He has been awarded for his excellence in import and export business.

Political career
Hari Singh Rawat is a business man. He spent his childhood in Rajasthan and then went to Mumbai and Gujrat for business but coming to his hometown and seeing it as one of the most backward areas of Rajasthan made him think and that’s how he decided to enter the system to serve people in 2002. Till 14th Vidhan Sabha  of his term, Hari Singh Rawat  has participated in debates and asked many questions in the Assembly. He has spoken on diverse issues that include matters of social justice, constituency development, education reforms etc.

Tenure as a Member of Legislative Assembly 
 Member of 14th Legislative Assembly at BJP Rajasthan (2013 - 2018)
 Former Member of 13th Legislative Assembly at BJP Rajasthan (2008–13)
 Former Member of 12th Legislative Assembly at BJP Rajasthan (2003–08)
 Member, Rules committee/Rules Subcommittee(2014–15)
 Member, Rules committee/Rules Subcommittee(2015–16)
 Member, Rules committee/Rules Subcommittee(2016–17)
 Member, Rules committee/Rules Subcommittee(2017–18)
 Member, Rules committee/Rules Subcommittee(2018–19)
 Member, Question & Reference committee(2017–18)
 Member, Question & Reference committee(2018–19)
 Chairman of Pink City Creative society Jaipur (2004–05)
 District Vice Chairman Member of Military welfare board, Rajasthan (2003 to 2008)
 Chairman (State Minister), State Magra Vikas board, Rajasthan Govt. (Jan, 2016 to nov, 2018)

Following are the issues strongly advocated by Mr Hari Singh Rawat:

He has raised many questions related to the improvement of education standards and amenities in the Assembly. All his speeches in the constituency always include a mention of prioritizing education.  The most notable example being is he has opened a girl’s college in Bhim and now 60% girls are able to attend college. He has raised the issue to introduce science as stream in his constituency. Kasturba school should be extended from 8th  class to 12th class.

He has been proactively working towards ensuring that citizens get access to basic civic amenities. He has consistently been raising the matter of drinking water accessibility for his constituency. He is keenly interested in improvement of healthcare and sanitation practices, issues that affect the farming community and the youth. Bhim constituency was dominated by one party.(Indian National Congress from 1947 to 2003)  Hari Singh Rawat is the first Bharatiya Janta Party(BJP) candidate to win from that constituency. After Hari Singh Rawat coming to power every election of Zila Parishad, Nagar Palika etc. is won by Bharatiya Janta Party.

References 

Living people
Bharatiya Janata Party politicians from Rajasthan
Rajasthan MLAs 2013–2018
1955 births